"Good Morning Good Morning" is a song by the English rock band the Beatles from their 1967 album Sgt. Pepper's Lonely Hearts Club Band. It was written by John Lennon and credited to Lennon–McCartney. Inspiration for the song came to Lennon from a television commercial for Kellogg's Corn Flakes. Another reference to contemporary television was the lyric "It's time for tea and Meet the Wife", referring to the BBC sitcom.

Lennon himself was critical of the track. "It's a throwaway, a piece of garbage, I always thought," he once said. "I always had the TV on very low in the background when I was writing, and it came over, and then I wrote the song."

Recording
The basic track was recorded on 8 February 1967, with overdubs on 16 February (bass guitar and lead vocals), 13 March (brass section), 28 March (backing vocals and guitar solo), and 29 March (animal noises). The guitar solo was played by Paul McCartney on a Fender Esquire. At Lennon's request, George Martin brought in Sounds Incorporated to provide the song's prominent brass backing.

Lennon asked engineer Geoff Emerick to arrange the animal noises heard at beginning (and end) of the song so that each animal heard was one capable of devouring (or frightening) the animal preceding it. The final sound effect of a chicken clucking was so placed that it transforms into the guitar on the following track, "Sgt. Pepper's Lonely Hearts Club Band (Reprise)". According to Emerick, these animal noises were inspired by the coda of "Caroline, No" that ended the Beach Boys' Pet Sounds album. They begin with the crow of a rooster, while the other animal sounds heard at the end of the song include birds, a cat, a dog, a cow, a horse, a sheep, a group of bloodhounds accompanying fox hunters on horseback with horns blasting, and a chicken.

The rapid 16th note bass drum fills were done on two bass drums, according to Beatles historian Mark Lewisohn. The length of the mono version of "Good Morning Good Morning" is 2:35, whereas the stereo version (due to a lengthier fade out of animal sounds) runs to 2:41. The 2017 stereo mix follows the editing style of the mono version, and as a result, it is also 2:35.

For the Beatles' 2006 remix album, Love, the horse sounds were mixed into "Being for the Benefit of Mr. Kite!".

Rhythm
The song is played at 117 beats per minute, has an unusual rhythmic feel, and uses different time signatures. Beats are played in groups of 2, 3 and 4, and time signature changes frequently. Most of the song uses simple time, where the beats are divided into two, but the middle eight sections use compound time, where the beats are divided into triplets.

The song is divided into seven sections, two of which are repeated once and one twice, in a time-symmetric pattern A, B, C, B, C, B, A (disregarding the fade out of the last bar):

A: 4,4,4,4,4 (introduction: five bars, 20 beats)
B: 5,5,5,3,4,5,4,3,3,4,4 (eleven bars, 44 beats)
C: 5,5,5,3,4,4,4,4,4,4 (contains refrain: ten bars, 42 beats)
B: 5,5,5,3,4,5,4,3,3,4,4 (eleven bars, 44 beats)
C: 5,5,5,3,4,4,4,4,4,4 (contains refrain: ten bars, 42 beats)
B: 5,5,5,3,4,5,4,3,3,4,4 (eleven bars, 44 beats)
A: 4,4,4,4,4,4 (end: six bars, 24 beats, with fade out bar)

That adds up to 64 bars with 260 beats which, at the published 117 beats per minute, would result in a length of 2:13.333... minutes.

Cover versions

 1988 – The Triffids, Sgt. Pepper Knew My Father compilation
 2007 – The M's, Sgt. Pepper ...With A Little Help From His Friends (Mojo compilation)
 2009 – Easy Star All-Stars featuring Steel Pulse, Easy Star's Lonely Hearts Dub Band
 2012 –  Micky Dolenz performed the song on his album Remember
 2014 – Zorch, Grace Potter & Treasure Mammal, on the Flaming Lips cover album With a Little Help from My Fwends

Personnel
Personnel per Ian MacDonald:
The Beatles
John Lennon – double-tracked lead vocal, lead guitar, rhythm guitar, backing vocal
Paul McCartney – bass, backing vocal, bass drum
George Harrison – rhythm guitar, backing vocal
Ringo Starr – drums, tambourine

Wind instruments
Barrie Cameron – saxophone
David Glyde – saxophone
Alan Holmes – saxophone
John Lee – trombone
Unknown – trombone
Unknown – french horn
Sounds Incorporated – brass

Production
Geoff Emerick – engineer
George Martin – producer

Notes

References

External links

1967 songs
The Beatles songs
Song recordings produced by George Martin
Songs written by Lennon–McCartney
Songs published by Northern Songs
British hard rock songs